The Very Best of Asleep at the Wheel is the 16th studio album by American country band Asleep at the Wheel. Recorded at Bismeaux Studio in Austin, Texas and Bradley's Barn in Nashville, Tennessee, it was produced by the band's frontman Ray Benson and released on June 5, 2001, by Relentless Nashville, an imprint of Madacy Entertainment Group. The album was issued in the United Kingdom in 2003 by Evangeline Records under the title Take Me Back to Tulsa.

Despite its title, The Very Best of Asleep at the Wheel is not a greatest hits collection or other compilation; rather, it features newly re-recorded versions of the some of the band's most popular songs from earlier releases. In addition to the group's regular lineup – which includes debutant John Michael Whitby on piano – the album also features several guest performers, including former steel guitarist Lucky Oceans, Johnny Gimble on mandolin and Huey Lewis on harmonica.

The Very Best of Asleep at the Wheel did not register on any record charts, but received a positive reception from critics. Reviewers praised the band's choice of songs, which they agreed served as a good introduction to the group for new listeners. Two songs from the record were nominated for Grammy Awards: "Ain't Nobody Here but Us Chickens" for Best Country Performance by a Duo or Group with Vocal and "Sugarfoot Rag" for Best Country Instrumental Performance.

Background
According to Asleep at the Wheel frontman Ray Benson, the main reason the band decided to re-record several of its most popular songs was because many of their original albums were out-of-print, and the band did not own the rights to distribute them. In a feature published in Billboard magazine, the bandleader explained that "not only do we not own our records, but they're not available", adding that it would be impossible to compile the tracks in a greatest hits collection because "All our stuff is scattered over so many labels that won't cooperate". Additionally, Benson added in another interview that he "wasn't happy with how a lot of the original tunes were recorded", and that he wanted to re-record the songs with himself on lead vocals, as the original recordings featured former band members who had departed several years ago.

For the release of the album, Asleep at the Wheel signed with Relentless Nashville Records, a new label formed under the Madacy Entertainment Group. Speaking about the partnership, Benson outlined that "I'm not giving any label ownership of this record ... Our last experience with DreamWorks [Ride with Bob: A Tribute to Bob Wills and the Texas Playboys] was a disaster. I provided them with a lasting, genuine work of art ... and all they did was botch the promotion and drop us, even though we sold a quarter-million records and won three Grammys." Dave Roy, head of Relentless Nashville, commented that "There was a real comfort level" when he met Benson, noting that he signed the band because "[Although] they get little radio play, [they] continue to tour and win Grammys year after year, and they're fan favorites."

Upon its announcement, the title The Very Best of Asleep at the Wheel initially caused confusion with audiences and commentators, who believed it to be merely a compilation of previously released recordings. Benson admitted that he "didn't realize when [announcing the album] that it would cause confusion", but added that "This is my attempt ... to set the record straight. This is my chance to say, 'This is really how I like to do the songs.'" The frontman suggested that it was easy to choose which songs to record, stating that "that's what this album is, the evolution of all these arrangements over the years ... They were easy to identify as the songs we needed to do."

Reception

Media response to The Very Best of Asleep at the Wheel was generally positive. In a four-star review for AllMusic, Charlotte Dillon called the album "an excellent offering that brings together many old fan favorites," adding that "The end result was worth the redoing, not that anything was wrong with the originals." Craig Havighurst of The Tennessean praised the album as "a classic collection of songs, well recorded, from one of America's best party bands," highlighting the recordings of "Get Your Kicks on Route 66", "House of Blue Lights" and "Miles and Miles of Texas" in particular. Country Standard Time writer Henry Koretzky claimed that the release "shows that Benson and company are still the very best at bringing the Texas Playboys sound to the world of contemporary country music." Koretzky also called the album "as good an opportunity as any to appreciate how effortlessly the band has always shifted from pure honky tonk country ... to the uptown swing of Louis Jordan".

Accolades
The Very Best of Asleep at the Wheel earned the band two nominations at the 44th Annual Grammy Awards – "Ain't Nobody Here but Us Chickens" was shortlisted in the category of Best Country Performance by a Duo or Group with Vocal, while "Sugarfoot Rag" was nominated for Best Country Instrumental Performance.

Track listing
{{Track listing
| extra_column = Original Album
| title1       = The Letter (That Johnny Walker Read)
| extra1       = Texas Gold (1975)
| note1        = 
| writer1      = 
| length1      = 3:50

| title2       = Ain't Nobody Here but Us Chickens
| extra2       = Collision Course (1978)
| writer2      = Joan Whitney
| length2      = 3:27

| title3       = Get Your Kicks on Route 66
| extra3       = Wheelin' and Dealin' (1976)
| writer3      = Bobby Troup
| length3      = 3:12

| title4       = Take Me Back to Tulsa
| extra4       = Comin' Right at Ya (1973)
| writer4      = 
| length4      = 3:34

| title5       = My Baby Thinks She's a Train
| extra5       = The Wheel (1977)
| writer5      = Preston
| length5      = 3:48

| title6       = House of Blue Lights
| extra6       = 10 (1987)
| writer6      = 
| length6      = 3:15

| title7       = Miles and Miles of Texas
| extra7       = ''Wheelin' and Dealin| writer7      = 
| length7      = 3:22

| title8       = Sugarfoot Rag
| extra8       = Western Standard Time (1988)
| note8        = 
| writer8      = 
| length8      = 3:34

| title9       = Choo Choo Ch'Boogie
| extra9       = Asleep at the Wheel (1974)
| writer9      = 
| length9      = 3:21

| title10      = Dance with Who Brung Ya
| extra10      = Keepin' Me Up Nights (1990)
| writer10     = Benson
| length10     = 3:34

| title11      = Big Balls in Cowtown
| extra11      = Tribute to the Music of Bob Wills and the Texas Playboys (1993)
| note11       = 
| writer11     = Hoyle Nix
| length11     = 3:30

| title12      = The Last Meal
| extra12      = Served Live (1979)
| note12       = 
| writer12     = Denny Hall
| length12     = 3:58

| title13      = Boogie Back to Texas
| extra13      = 10
| writer13     = Benson
| length13     = 3:27

| title14      = Texas Me and You
| extra14      = Collision Course
| note14       = 
| writer14     = Benson
| length14     = 3:28

| total_length = 49:29
}}

PersonnelAsleep at the WheelRay Benson – lead and rhythm guitars, six-string bass, lead and backing vocals, production
Cindy Cashdollar – steel guitar 
David Miller – bass, backing vocals
John Michael Whitby – piano, backing vocals
David Sanger – drums
Jason Roberts – fiddle, guitar, backing vocals
Michael Francis – saxophoneGuest performersLucky Oceans – steel guitar 
Mandy Barnett – vocals 
Carco Clave – steel guitar 
Brad Paisley – lead guitar 
Johnny Gimble – electric mandolin 
Huey Lewis – harmonica 
Eliza Gilkyson – vocals 
Lloyd Maines – steel guitar Additional personnel'''
Larry Seyer – engineering
Bobby Bradley – engineering
Lee Buddle – engineering
Johnny Colla – engineering
Eric Lambert – engineering assistance
Mark Nathan – engineering assistance
Tim Stanton – engineering assistance
Dick Reeves – art direction, design
Wyatt McSpadden – photography

References

External links

Very Best of Asleep at the Wheel, The
Very Best of Asleep at the Wheel, The